Five Men Live is a Talisman live record a part of a double package that Frontiers Records released with the band.

Track listing
Track List CD1: Live at Stockholm, Sweden on 4 August 2003
  "Break Your Chains"
  "Colour My XTC"
  "Fabricated War"
  "Mysterious"
  "Skin on Skin"
  "Tears in the Sky"
  "Crazy"
  "In Make Believe"
  "Scream of Anger"
  "If Only You Would Be My Friend"
  "Break It Down Again"
  "I'll Be Waiting"
  "NJBBWD"
  "Outta My Way"
  "Fredrik Åkesson Solo"
  "Standing on Fire"
  "I Don't Know" (Ozzy Osbourne's cover)

Track List CD2: Live at Sweden Rock Festival in June 2003
 "Break Your Chains"
 "Color My XTC"
 "Fabricated War"
 "Tears in the Sky"
 "Crazy"
 "Break It Down Again"
 "Mysterious (This Time It's Serious)"
 "Standing on Fire"
 "In Make Believe"
 "I'll Be Waiting"

Personnel
Jeff Scott Soto – lead vocals
Marcel Jacob – bass
Fredrick Åkesson – guitar
Jamie Borger – drums
Howie Simon – guitar/background vocals

References
 Talisman Official website

Talisman (band) albums
2005 live albums
Frontiers Records live albums